Ferdinand Carl Valentin Haecker (15 September 1864 – 19 December 1927) was a German zoologist, reader at Freiburg University from 1892.
In 1900, he became professor at the University of Applied Sciences Stuttgart and in 1909 at Martin Luther University of Halle-Wittenberg.
He was president of the Deutsche Zoologische Gesellschaft from 1922.
He died unexpectedly from a stroke.

Haecker's contributions span the fields of  ornithology, plankton (Radiolaria) cell biology,
developmental physiology, genetics (where he established the subfield of phenogenetics). 
He also published a historical treatise on Goethe's work on morphology.

References

 Rudolf Haecker: Das Leben von Valentin Haecker. in: Zoologischer Anzeiger, Band 174, Heft 1/1965, pp. 1–14, 
 Georg Uschmann: Haecker, Ferdinand Carl Valentin. In: Neue Deutsche Biographie (NDB). Band 7, Duncker & Humblot, Berlin 1966,  427 f. 
 Hans-Albrecht Freye: Valentin Haecker 1864 bis 1927. Leben und Werk. in: Hercynia, Band 2, Heft 3/1965,  326–337, 
 Haecker, Valentin Carl Ferdinand, in Jürgen Dietrich Kurt Kiefer: Bio-bibliographisches Handbuch der Akademie Gemeinnütziger Wissenschaften zu Erfurt. Akademie Gemeinnütziger Wissenschaften zu Erfurt, Erfurt 2005,  234.

German geneticists
19th-century German zoologists
1864 births
1927 deaths
20th-century German zoologists